Henry Neil Mallon (January 11, 1895 – March 1, 1983) was an American businessman. He served as the chair of the board, president, and director of Dresser Industries (Cleveland, OH) (now Halliburton).

Early life
Henry Neil Mallon was born in Cincinnati on January 11, 1895. He graduated from Yale University, where he became friends with Prescott Bush.

Career
Mallon served as chair of the board, president, and director of Dresser Industries. He was also the president of Dresser Manufacturing Limited (Toronto, Ontario, Canada); the chair of the board, director, Bryant Heater Company (Cleveland, Ohio); factory manager, general manager, director 20–29, US Can Company (Cincinnati, Ohio); 19–20 w/Continental Can Company (Chicago, Illinois); Director, Bovaud & Seyfang Manufacturing Company (Bradford, Pennsylvania), Clark Brothers Inc (Olean, New York), Day & Night Manufacturing Company (Monrovia, California), International Derrick & Equipment Company (Columbus, Ohio), Kobe, Inc (Huntington Park, California), Pacific Pumps, Inc (CA), Roots-Connersville Blower Corporation (Connersville, Indiana), Security Engineering Company (Whittier, California), Stacey Brothers, Gus Construction Company (Cincinnati, Ohio), Pharis Tire & Rubber Company (Newark, Ohio), Petrolite Corporation (St. Louis, Missouri), Magazines of Industry (New York City), Hydrocarbon Research Inc (New York City), Carthage Hydrocol Corporation (New York City).

Mallon hired George Herbert Walker Bush to work for Dresser Industries in West Texas shortly after he graduated from Yale University. He was also an early investor in Zapata Corporation, founded by Bush. Bush in turn named one of his sons, Neil Mallon Bush, after his mentor.

Death
Mallon died on March 1, 1983, in Dallas, Texas.

References

1895 births
1983 deaths
Yale University alumni
20th-century American businesspeople
Texas Republicans